Nação Zumbi (formerly Chico Science & Nação Zumbi) is a Brazilian band formed by Chico Science. They have been hailed as one of the most important groups to come out of the manguebeat movement in the 1990s. The musicians of the group continued as Nação Zumbi after Chico died in a car accident on February 2, 1997. 

In their songs they experiment with mixing of rock, punk, funk, hip hop, soul, Pernambuco's regional rhythms and Brazilian traditional music, with heavy use of percussion instruments.

They released two albums before the time of Chico's death, Da lama ao caos (From Mud to Chaos) in 1994 and Afrociberdelia in 1996. Both received critical acclaim.

In 1996, Nação Zumbi contributed Maracatu Atômico to the AIDS-Benefit Album Red Hot + Rio produced by the Red Hot Organization.

Members 
 Jorge Du Peixe - vocal, sampler (1998-present) alfaia (1992-1997)
 Lúcio Maia - guitar, backing vocals
 Alexandre Dengue - bass, backing vocals
 Toca Ogam - percussion, vocals
 Gustavo Da Lua - alfaia, percussion
 Tom Rocha - drums (2018-present) alfaia, percussion (2013-2018)
 Marcos Matias - alfaia, percussion

Ex-members 
 Chico Science - vocals (1993-1997; died 1997)
 Canhoto - snare drum (1993-1995)
 Kuki Storlaski - drums (1995)
 Gira - alfaia (1993-2000)
 Marcos Matias - alfaia (1998-2011)
 Ramon Lira - alfaia (2011-2012)
 Gilmar Bola 8 - alfaia, percussion (1993-2015)
 Pupillo - drums, percussion (1995-2018)

Discography
1994: Da Lama ao Caos - Gold
1996: Afrociberdelia - Gold
1998: CSNZ
2000: Rádio S.AMB.A
2002: Nação Zumbi
2005: Futura
2007: Fome de tudo
2014: Nação Zumbi

References

External links

 Official website
 Twitter
 Channel Chico Science

Brazilian rock music groups
Brazilian punk rock groups
Musical groups established in 1991
1991 establishments in Brazil